Florian Ondruschka (born June 24, 1987) is a German professional ice hockey defenceman. He is currently playing for VER Selb in the Oberliga. He formerly played with the Straubing Tigers in the Deutsche Eishockey Liga (DEL).

References

External links

1987 births
Living people
German ice hockey defencemen
Straubing Tigers players
Thomas Sabo Ice Tigers players